Guanylyl cyclase-activating protein 2 is an enzyme that in humans is encoded by the GUCA1B gene. Alternative names:
 Guanylate cyclase activator 1B
 Retinal guanylyl cyclase activator protein p24

Biological Role
Guanylyl cyclase-activating protein 2 is proposed to play a role in dark adaptation. Under scotopic conditions, calcium ions bind to three putative EF-hand calcium binding motifs which reduces the protein's ability to stimulate guanylyl cyclase. This contributes to the maintained responsiveness of rod photoreceptors through hyperpolarizing them during sustained darkness.

References

Further reading

External links 
 GeneReviews/NCBI/NIH/UW entry on Retinitis Pigmentosa Overview

EF-hand-containing proteins